Kelantan Football Club (Piala Tun Sharifah Rodziah) is a women's football team from Kota Bharu representing the state of Kelantan. Founded in 2017, the team competes in Piala Tun Sharifah Rodziah. 2017 is their debut appearance in the competition managed by the Football Association of Malaysia (FAM).

History
The Kelantan Football Club (Piala Tun Sharifah Rodziah) team or Kelantan F.C. women's football team was formed in 2017 originally for the preparation of Tun Sharifah Rodziah Cup tournament. The team consist former Liga Bolasepak Rakyat Wanita players, who represented the club in state of Kelantan and others via players selection on 11 March 2017 at the University of Science, Malaysia Mini Stadium, Kubang Kerian. The 2017 Piala Tun Sharifah Rodziah tournament will be held in Miri, Sarawak starting 6 April until 16 April 2017. 12 teams have confirmed their participation in the tournament. During 2017 tournament, the teams were divided into three groups and Kelantan were draw into Group C along with Sarawak, Pahang and Negeri Sembilan.

Kelantan women's team was not eligible for the knockout stage after two defeats and a draw in the group stage. They gained third-placed in the table with 1 goal and conceded 6 goals along the campaign. The only goal scored was during the draw against Negeri Sembilan by Siti Hajar Mat Zaid.

Current squad

Piala Tun Sharifah Rodziah

Source:

Goalscorer

Sponsors

Staff
 Manager: Arif Hassan
 Assistant Manager: Md Salzihan Md Salleh
 Head Coach: Abd Hamid Ramli
 Assistant Coach: Mohd Afindi Ibrahim
 Physiotherapist: Anis Aliyya Mazuki
 Administrative Officer: Mohd Yuzmuhaimizee Yaacob

Affiliate
 Kelantan F.C.

References

External links
 Official Facebook page

Women's football in Malaysia
Football in Malaysia
Organizations established in 2017